Prayers for the Assassin is a political thriller, and a work of speculative fiction, written by American crime writer Robert Ferrigno. The story is set in 2040, after economic strife and a pair of nuclear attacks have led to civil war, causing the United States to split into two hostile and competing nations: one a moderate Islamic republic with its capital in Seattle, the other a breakaway Christian Bible Belt built on the ashes of the former Confederacy and with its capital in Atlanta.

The hardcover edition of Prayers for the Assassin was published in the United States in February 2006 by Charles Scribner's Sons.

Plot summary 
The book starts off during the second American Civil War with a Muslim soldier dying in 2017, at the battle of Newark. Flash forward to the Super Bowl in 2042 in Seattle, the capital of the new Islamic Republic, the majority of whose inhabitants have converted to Islam. The nation's culture is a fusion of traditional American and Islamic: the Super Bowl is still played, but the cheerleaders are sword-wielding men and the participants break at half-time for afternoon prayers.

As the story opens, the country is facing a crisis, with competing political and religious factions threatening to destroy the fragile peace that exists within the Islamic States of America. At the same time, behind the scenes, a messianic figure known as the Wise Old One contrives to seize power for himself, and fulfill the ancient prophecy of the restoration of the Caliphate.

The story's protagonist is Rakkim Epps, a Muslim and ex-Fedayeen shadow warrior. Epps must risk everything to save the life of Sarah Dougan, the young historian he loves.

It becomes known that it was in fact Muslim extremists who launched the attacks, including the dirty bomb in Mecca.  A fourth, more powerful bomb (later found in China) was scheduled for detonation but the small group of Muslim extremists assigned the task succumbed to radiation poisoning before it could be put into play.

Once the truth was exposed, the parties stepped back from the brink and sought to find a common ground from which to start a more trusting, more open-minded dialog. Thomas "Redbeard" Dougan, Sarah's uncle, dies in the aftermath.

At the epilogue, Rakkim is in a mosque, performing his salat, or ritual prayer. There is a final showdown between Darwin, the "evil" assassin and Rakkim, with both of them almost dying. Rakkim finishes the showdown by killing Darwin with a knife throw to the face, but the rest of the ending sets up the conditions for the sequel.

The New America 
After nuclear suitcase bombs completely destroy New York City and Washington D.C. and a dirty bomb irradiates Mecca the United States is split into four pieces.
The Islamic Republic comprises the west coast, southwest, and most of the Midwest. After the bomb attacks were revealed to have been done by Israeli agents and many celebrity conversions (including country star "Shania X") a large proportion of the country converted to Islam. The new country was founded as a beacon of light, but has failed to live up. Civil liberties are severely curtailed with the first and second amendments removed and a Wahabi/Talibanesque religious police called the Black Robes gaining more and more power.

Jews (blamed for the destruction of Washington and New York) are ostracized and Catholics have taken the role of second class citizens. The roads are falling apart, satellite communications are often down, and the I.R. lacks scientific growth, living off excess technology stored by the former United States. The U.S. military has advanced little, with modern technology the best it can produce, the main reason that the two main power countries Russia and China avoid an attack is the elite training of the Fedayeen corps. The Fedayeen are essentially the guards of the republic, mostly made up of converts and veterans of the civil war. They are loyal to the democratic Islamic government though they are constantly courted by the extremist Black Robes whose police force are bitter rivals of the Fedeyeen. Many landmarks and warships were renamed after Islamic figures, the best example being the  renamed the USS Osama bin Laden or Seattle's football facility is called Khomeini Stadium. It is mentioned that the new government attempted to destroy Mount Rushmore, but gave up due to the sheer size of the monument.

The Bible Belt, a partially recognised separatist republic that comprises the old south plus Kentucky, Tennessee, West Virginia, Virginia and most of Missouri disputed between itself and the Islamic State. After the transition millions of evangelical Christians immigrated here. Its government is thought to be much looser and decentralized, resembling the old Confederacy. The technology they possess is not made clear, although it is mentioned they have the only recipe for Coca-Cola.

Nevada is its own free state with a large and growing population, it serves exactly the same capacity as it does now.

The Mormon territories comprise Utah, plus parts of Colorado and Idaho. Little is mentioned about it. They may however not be a separate state, the map in the book (the UK version of the book does not contain a map) suggests they may just be an autonomous region within the Islamic Republic.

Parts of New Mexico, Arizona and Southern California have been claimed by the Aztlan Empire (formerly Mexico) and tension between the I.R. and A.E. have risen due to land claims.

Hawaii is described in the same context as Canada so could be independent. Alaska and the most Northerly New England States are not described.

Canada has snatched some of Minnesota and Wisconsin as "ancestral lands" for its native population.

Additionally, Southern Florida has become its own state, using a flag similar to Puerto Rico or Cuba.

The Islamic Republic has long been suffering an internal war between its moderate/modern wanting to preserve its democratic traditional government and fundamentalist factions wishing to create a fundamentalist Islamic State under the strict form Sharia law.

Characters 
Rakkim Epps: The story's protagonist, a Muslim ex-Fedayeen shadow warrior, who is currently running a night club in Seattle's Christian Zone, where Muslims and Christians alike can commit illegal acts and businesses. He is hired to track down Sarah (his longtime love interest) by her uncle, when it is discovered that she has disappeared.
Sarah Dougan: Rakkim's lover, a young college professor who attracts a great deal of controversy in her short career, having recently authored a book on the American's conversion to Islam which angered the country's fundamentalist population. While working on her latest book, one of her sources informs her to go into hiding because her work has attracted the attention of a mysterious figure who was behind her father's assassination.
Thomas "Redbeard" Dougan: Sarah's uncle and head of the Department of State Security. He is seen as the constant target of the country's fundamentalist leaders, a true patriot of his country. He took in Rakkin while he was a young orphan; he also raised Sarah after his brother's assassination and her mother's mysterious disappearance. They had a falling out when Rakkim joined the Fedeyeen and were not on speaking terms after he refused to grant Rakkim's request to marry Sarah. With the disappearance of his niece and knowing that his rivals were closing in on him, he overcomes his estrangement with Rakkim and asks him to find Sarah.
The Old One aka Hassan Muhammad: a terrorist mastermind responsible for the shaping of much of the current world. Although his actual age is unknown due to scientific procedures that help him live longer, he is estimated to be around 70–90 years old. Possibly a Yemeni who speaks his English with a British accent, presumably indicating where he received his education. He is the one who ordered the assassination of Sarah's father and discovers that her latest work could threaten to expose his life's work.
Darwin Conklin: A psychopathic ex-Fedayeen assassin hired by the Old One to track down Sarah (despite being described by the Old One's son as a demon), he leaves a bloody trail of murders throughout his journey.
Mullah Ibn Azziz: The new leader of the Blackrobes order, a young extremist who seeks to create a fundamentalist society cleansed of Catholics, Jews, and non-fundamentalist Muslims. He knows nothing of the Old One though his swift rise through the Blackrobes ranks was mostly due to him; when he discovers Sarah's disappearance he believes she is seeing a lover; he proposes to find her and use her to destabilize Redbeard's leadership.
Angelina: Redbeard's loyal, kind-hearted house maid.
Anthony Colarusso Sr.: A Catholic Seattle detective who is a good friend of Rakkim; also a former Catholic priest who now has a family of his own. His son Anthony Jr. is local hoodlum but hopes to join the Fedeyeen which his father encourages to help improve their social standing. Initially Rakkim refuses to give his recommendation, until he recognizes that he will better off in the Fedyeen than the streets, and agrees.
Mardi: Rakkim's business partner at the night club, she's also the widow of Rakkim's Fedeyeen friend Tariq. She largely blames herself for his death, believing her refusal to convert cost him a promotion. Occasionally they sleep together though he stopped after he started seeing Sarah, which makes her a bit jealous.

Marketing 
Publisher Charles Scribner's Sons hired interactive design firm LevelTen Design to promote the book online through three websites, including one, "Republic World News", which was a fake news site for the "Islamic States of America". The Denver Post wrote, "With Prayers campaign of so-called "viral marketing" to generate buzz, instead of traditional advertising venues, could this be a new world order in the way books are sold?"

External links 
 Robert Ferrigno's Official Web Site
 "Republic World News" - Fake news site for the "Islamic States of America," created to market the book
Robert Ferrigno's Frightening Prophecy - Can it Really Come True?

2006 American novels
Dystopian novels
2006 science fiction novels
American science fiction novels
American speculative fiction novels
Political thriller novels
Fiction set in 2040
American political novels
American thriller novels
Novels set in fictional countries